Prof. Dukha Bhagat (29 April 1953 – 23 April 2021) was an Indian politician.

Biography
He was a Member of Parliament, representing Lohardaga, Bihar in the Lok Sabha, the lower house of India's Parliament, as a member of the Bharatiya Janata Party.

Bhagat died from COVID-19 on 23 April 2021, aged 67.

References

External links
Official biographical sketch in Parliament of India website

1953 births
2021 deaths
Lok Sabha members from Jharkhand
Bharatiya Janata Party politicians from Jharkhand
People from Lohardaga district
Deaths from the COVID-19 pandemic in India